Košarkaški klub Loznica , commonly referred to as KK Loznica, is a men's basketball club based in Loznica, Serbia. They are currently competing in the 3rd-tier First Regional League – Division West. The club was founded in 1963.

Home arenas 

The team play domestic home matches in the Lagator Hall.

Players

Coaches

See also 
 ŽKK Loznica

References

External links
Statistics at srbijasport.net
Club Profile at eurobasket.com

Loznica
Loznica
Loznica
1963 establishments in Serbia
Loznica